The Hutton Medal is awarded annually by the Royal Society Te Apārangi to a researcher who, working within New Zealand, has significantly advanced understanding through work of outstanding scientific or technological merit.

Requirements 
Prior to 2017 it was awarded in rotation for research in animal sciences, earth sciences, or plant sciences. From, and including, 2017, it is awarded to any of the three disciplines but will not normally be awarded in the same discipline two years in a row. The awardee must have received the greater part of his/her education in New Zealand or have resided in New Zealand for not less than 10 years.

The bronze medal has a portrait of Hutton on one side, with a landscape on the reverse featuring a kiwi, a tuatara, New Zealand plants (Celmisia, Phormium, Cordyline) and an active volcano in the background.

Background 
The award is named after Frederick Wollaston Hutton FRS (1836–1905). Hutton was the first President of the New Zealand Institute (the forerunner to the Royal Society), serving from 1904 to 1905. In 1909 the Hutton Memorial Fund was established to support the Hutton Medal and also grants for research in New Zealand zoology, botany or geology.

Until 1996 the medal was awarded not more than once every three years, from 1996 to 2008 the medal was awarded biennially and from 2009 it has been awarded annually.

Recipients 
There have been the following recipients of the Hutton Medal.

References 

Royal Society of New Zealand
New Zealand science and technology awards
Science and technology in New Zealand
Awards established in 1911